Kamel Larbi may refer to:
 Kamel Larbi (footballer)
 Kamel Larbi (judoka)